The following is a list of current National Basketball Association broadcasters for each individual team entering the 2022-23 NBA season.

Regional broadcasters

Eastern Conference

Atlantic Division

Television

Radio

Spanish

French

Central Division

Television

Radio

Spanish

Southeast Division

Television

Radio

Spanish

Western Conference

Northwest Division

Television

Radio

Spanish

Pacific Division

Television

Radio

Spanish

Southwest Division

Television

Radio

Spanish

National broadcasters

ESPN/ABC

Play-by-play announcers
Mike Breen
Mark Jones
Dave Pasch
Ryan Ruocco
Beth Mowins
Marc Kestecher

Color analysts
Jeff Van Gundy
Mark Jackson
Doris Burke
Hubie Brown
Richard Jefferson
Vince Carter
JJ Redick

Sideline reporters
Lisa Salters 
Cassidy Hubbarth
Jorge Sedano
Malika Andrews
 Monica McNutt
 Israel Gutierrez
 Katie George
 Rosalyn Gold-Onwude

Spanish Commentators
ESPN Deportes, ABC in Spanish on SAP
Andrés Nocioni
Ernesto Jerez
Carlos Morales
Claudia Trejos
Fabricio Oberto
Fernando Álvarez
Fernando Tirado
Jerry Olaya
Leonardo Montero
Marcelo Nogueira
Miguel Angel Briseno
Nicolás Ledesma 
Pablo Viruega
Sebastián Martínez Christensen

ESPN Radio

Play-by-play announcers
Marc Kestecher (Full season)

Color analysts
Jon Barry (Games w/Kestecher)
Hubie Brown
P. J. Carlesimo
Cory Alexander
 Rosalyn Gold-Onwude

TNT

Play-by-play announcers
Kevin Harlan
Brian Anderson
Ian Eagle
Spero Dedes

Color analysts
Reggie Miller
Jim Jackson
Stan Van Gundy
Greg Anthony
Grant Hill
Candace Parker

Sideline reporters
Allie LaForce
Stephanie Ready
Dennis Scott
 Jared Greenberg
 Chris Haynes
 Nabil Karim

Spanish commentators
Available on SAP
José Ángel Medellín
Marcelo Godoy
Pete Manzano
Fernando Palacios

NBA TV
Uses the home team's announcing team during games unless specified. During playoff games, announcers from TNT are used

International broadcasters

Americas

Central America and Mexico
  Costa Rica,  El Salvador,  Guatemala,  Honduras and  Nicaragua: ESPN
  Dominican Republic: ESPN, CDN Deportes, NBA TV International
  Mexico: ESPN, TUDN and NBA TV International
  Panama: ESPN, Cable Onda Sports and NBA TV International

South America
  Argentina: ESPN, DirecTV Sports, NBA TV International
  Bolivia: ESPN
  Brazil: ESPN, SporTV, TNT, Amazon Prime Video, Band, YouTube (TNT Sports Brasil) and Twitch (Gaules)
  Chile: ESPN, DirecTV Sports, NBA TV International
  Colombia: ESPN, DirecTV Sports, NBA TV International	
  Ecuador: ESPN, DirecTV Sports, NBA TV International	
  Paraguay: ESPN
  Peru: ESPN, DirecTV Sports, NBA TV International	
  Suriname: ESPN, SportsMax, SCCN, NBA TV International	
  Uruguay: ESPN, DirecTV Sports, NBA TV International
  Venezuela: ESPN, DirecTV Sports, NBA TV International

North America and Caribbean
  Canada: TSN, Sportsnet, NBA TV Canada and RDS
  Caribbean: ESPN, SportsMax	and NBA TV International
  Puerto Rico: ABC, ESPN, WAPA 2 Deportes, TNT, NBA TV

Europe
  Albania: Tring Sport
  Andorra: Movistar+	
  Armenia: Vivaro Media and Setanta Sports
  Austria: DAZN
  Azerbaijan: Setanta Sports
  Belarus: Setanta Sports
  Belgium: Eleven Sports
  Bosnia and Herzegovina: Arena Sport and NBA TV International   		
  Bulgaria: Diema Sport
  Croatia: Arena Sport
  Cyprus: CYTA and NBA TV International
  Czech Republic: Nova Sport	
  Denmark: TV 2 Sport	
  Estonia: TV3 Sport and NBA TV International
  Finland: Nelonen Media	
  France: beIN Sports	
  Georgia: Silknet and Setanta Sports
  Germany: DAZN and NBA TV International
  Greece: Cosmote Sport	
  Hungary: Sport1	
  Iceland: Stöð 2 Sport
  Ireland: Sky Sports
  Italy: Sky Sport	
  Kosovo: ArtSport and NBA TV International
  Latvia: TV3 Sport and NBA TV International
  Liechtenstein: DAZN
  Lithuania: TV3 Sport and NBA TV International 
  Luxembourg: Eleven Sports
  Moldova: Setanta Sports
  Montenegro: Arena Sport and NBA TV International
  Netherlands: ESPN
  North Macedonia: Arena Sport and NBA TV International
  Norway: VG+	
  Poland: Canal+	
  Portugal: Sport TV and NBA TV International
  Romania: Telekom Romania	
  (suspended)
  San Marino: Sky Sport	
  Serbia: Arena Sport and NBA TV International
  Slovakia: Nova Sport	
  Slovenia: Arena Sport and NBA TV International
  Spain: Movistar+	
  Sweden: C More Sport
  Switzerland: DAZN	
  Turkey: S Sport and NBA TV International
  Ukraine: Setanta Sports
  United Kingdom: Sky Sports, BBC

Sub-Saharan Africa
 Sub-Saharan Africa: ESPN, CanalSat Afrique and NBA TV International
  South Africa: SABC

Middle East and North Africa
  Israel: Sport 5
  MENA: beIN Sports

Asia-Pacific
 Central Asia: Setanta Sports
 Indian subcontinent: Viacom18
 China: Tencent, China Mobile, CCTV, Fujian TV, GreatSports Channel and Guangdong Television
  Hong Kong: Sports 2 World, ViuTV 
  Macau: M Plus, Sports 2 World 
  Indonesia: Emtek, TVRI and NBA TV International
  Japan: Rakuten
  Brunei and  Malaysia: Astro SuperSport	
  South Korea: SPOTV	
  Mongolia: SPS	
  Philippines: TV5 Network and NBA TV Philippines
  Singapore: Starhub and NBA TV International
  Taiwan: Videoland and ELTA TV
  Cambodia,  Laos and  Thailand: TrueVisions and NBA TV International
  Tajikistan: Varzish TV
  Vietnam: FPT

Oceania
  Australia: ESPN
  New Zealand: ESPN and NBA TV International
  Papua New Guinea and Pacific Islands: ESPN

See also
 NBA TV
 NBA TV Canada
 NBA TV Philippines
 NBA League Pass
 National Basketball Association on television
 List of current Major League Baseball broadcasters
 List of current National Football League broadcasters
 List of current Major League Soccer broadcasters
 List of current National Hockey League broadcasters
 List of historical NBA over-the-air television broadcasters

Notes

1.  Some Chicago Bulls games on WGN-TV were simulcast nationally on its superstation feed WGN America through the 2013–2014 season. Those simulcasts have been discontinued.

References

External links

 
National Basketball Association on television
National Basketball Association on the radio
NBA
Basketball on television
National Basketball Association broadcasters